Collisella was a genus of primitive sea snails, specifically true limpets, marine gastropod mollusks in the family Lottiidae, one of the families of true limpets. This genus has become a synonym of Lottia Gray, 1833 

This genus of shield limpets was classified by some authors under the family Acmaeidae.

Species

Species within the genus Collisella include:
 Collisella adami Christiaens, J., 1975
 Collisella borneensis
 Collisella kolarovai (Grabau, A.W. & S.G. King, 1928)
 Collisella pallidula Gould, A.A., 1859 - snowy limpet
 Collisella uncinata guadeloupa Christiaens, J., 1975
Species brought into synonymy
 Collisella abrolhosensis (Petuch, 1979): synonym of Lottia abrolhosensis (Petuch, 1979)
 Collisella aconcaguina (Ramírez, 1974): synonym of Scurria ceciliana (d'Orbigny, 1841)
 Collisella acutapex Berry, S.S., 1960: synonym of  Lottia acutapex (S. S. Berry, 1960) 
 Collisella araucana (Dall, 1871): synonym of Scurria araucana (d'Orbigny, 1841)
 Collisella atrata Carpenter, P.P., 1857: synonym of Lottia atrata (Carpenter, 1857)
 Collisella bahamondina (Ramírez, 1974): synonym of Scurria araucana (d'Orbigny, 1841)
 Collisella boehmita (Ramírez, 1974): synonym of Scurria ceciliana (d'Orbigny, 1841)
 Collisella borealis Lindberg, 1982: synonym of Lottia paradigitalis (Fritchman, 1960)
 Collisella canela (Ramírez, 1974): synonym of Scurria araucana (d'Orbigny, 1841)
 Collisella ceciliana (Marincovich, 1973): synonym of Scurria ceciliana (d'Orbigny, 1841)
 Collisella (Collisella) cellanica Christiaens, 1980: synonym of Lottia cellanica (Christiaens, 1980)
 Collisella chaitena (Ramírez, 1974): synonym of Scurria ceciliana (d'Orbigny, 1841)
 Collisella chilota (Ramírez, 1974): synonym of Scurria ceciliana (d'Orbigny, 1841)
 Collisella conus Test, A.R., 1945 - test limpet: synonym of Lottia conus (Test, 1945)
 Collisella dalcahuina (Ramírez, 1974): synonym of Scurria ceciliana (d'Orbigny, 1841)
 Collisella dalliana (Pilsbry, 1891): synonym of Lottia dalliana (Pilsbry, 1891)
 Collisella discors (Philippi, R.A., 1849): synonym of Lottia discors (Philippi, 1849)
 † Collisella edmitchelli Lipps, 1966: synonym of Lottia edmitchelli (Lipps, 1963)
 Collisella formosa Christiaens, 1980: synonym of Lottia formosa (Christiaens, 1980)
 Collisella huppeana (Ramírez, 1974): synonym of Scurria variabilis (G.B. Sowerby I, 1839)
 Collisella instabilis (Gould, A.A., 1846): synonym of Lottia instabilis (Gould, 1846)
 Collisella lacerta Ramírez-Boehme, 1974: synonym of Scurria araucana (d'Orbigny, 1841)
 Collisella lileana Ramírez-Boehme, 1970: synonym of Scurria araucana (d'Orbigny, 1841)
 Collisella marcusi (Righi, 1966): synonym of Lottia marcusi (Righi, 1966)
 Collisella mitella (Menke, 1847): synonym of Lottia mitella (Menke, 1847)
 Collisella mortoni  Christiaens, J., 1980: synonym of Lottia mortoni (Christiaens, J., 1980)
 Collisella noronhensis (E. A. Smith, 1890): synonym of Lottia noronhensis (E. A. Smith, 1890)
 Collisella ortiguilla (Ramírez, 1974): synonym of Scurria ceciliana (d'Orbigny, 1841)
 Collisella oyamai Habe, 1955: synonym of Yayoiacmea oyamai (Habe, 1955)
 Collisella pediculus (Philippi, 1846): synonym of Lottia pediculus (Philippi, 1846)
 Collisella philippiana (Ramírez, 1974): synonym of Scurria variabilis (G.B. Sowerby I, 1839)
 Collisella piteana (Ramírez, 1974): synonym of Scurria ceciliana (d'Orbigny, 1841)
 Collisella pladilla (Ramírez, 1974): synonym of Scurria araucana (d'Orbigny, 1841)
 Collisella pullallina (Ramírez, 1974): synonym of Scurria araucana (d'Orbigny, 1841)
 Collisella ruginosa Ramírez-Boehme, 1974: synonym of Scurria araucana (d'Orbigny, 1841)
 Collisella scabra: synonym of  Lottia scabra (Gould, 1846)
 Collisella silvana (Ramírez, 1974): synonym of Scurria silvana (Ramírez, 1974)
 Collisella stanfordiana (Berry, 1957): synonym of Lottia stanfordiana (Berry, 1957)
 Collisella strigatella (Carpenter, 1864): synonym of Lottia strigatella (Carpenter, 1864)
 Collisella strongiana (Hertlein, 1958): synonym of Lottia strongiana (Hertlein, 1958)
 Collisella subrugosa (Orbigny, 1846): synonym of Lottia subrugosa (d'Orbigny, 1846)
 Collisella tessulata (O. F. Müller, 1776): synonym of Testudinalia testudinalis (O. F. Müller, 1776)
 Collisella triangularis (Carpenter, P.P., 1864) - triangular limpet: synonym of Lottia triangularis (Carpenter, 1864)
 Collisella triangularis f. orcutti  Pilsbry, H.A., 1891
 Collisella turveri (Hertlein & Strong, 1951): synonym of Lottia turveri (Hertlein & Strong, 1951)
 Collisella variabilis (Marincovich, 1973): synonym of Scurria variabilis (G.B. Sowerby I, 1839)
 Collisella zebrina (Lesson, 1831): synonym of Scurria zebrina (Lesson, 1831)

Synonyms:
 Collisella pelta is a synonym of Lottia pelta (Rathke, 1833) 
 Colisella pelta pelta (Rathke, J. in Eschscholtz, J.F., 1833)
 Collisella pelta pelta f. postelsia
 Collisella pelta shirogai Habe, T. & K. Ito, 1965

References 

 Vaught, K.C. (1989). A classification of the living Mollusca. American Malacologists: Melbourne, FL (USA). . XII, 195 pp

Further reading
 Lindberg D. R. (1982). "Taxonomic notes on members of the genus Collisella from the North Pacific Ocean including the description of a new species from Alaska (Gastropoda: Acmaeidae)". Wasmann Jour. Biol. 40(1-2): 48-58.

External links 

Lottiidae
Taxonomy articles created by Polbot